Miguel Gallastegui Ariznavarreta (25 February 1918 – 4 January 2019) was a Gipuzkoan pelotari (a Basque pelota player). He debuted on 29 June 1936 and played the sport until 1960.

References

External links
 

1918 births
2019 deaths
Men centenarians
Sportspeople from Eibar
Spanish centenarians
Spanish pelotaris
Pelotaris from the Basque Country (autonomous community)